The 2020 Russian Mixed Doubles Curling Championship was held in Krasnoyarsk at the Crystal Ice Arena from February 24 to March 1, 2020.

The championship was won (third time in a row) by team "Moscow Oblast 1" (Anastasia Moskaleva / Alexander Eremin), who beat team "Saint Petersburg 3" (Alina Kovaleva / Alexey Timofeev) in the final. The Bronze medal was won by team "Moscow Oblast 2" (Daria Styoksova / Mikhail Vaskov).

Division A

Teams

Round robin

Group A

Group B

Playoffs

All draws times are listed in UTC+07:00.

"PP" - power play

Quarterfinals
February 28, 19:00

Semifinals
February 29, 10:00

Bronze-medal game
February 29, 15:00

Final
February 29, 15:00

Division B

Teams

Round robin

Group A

Group B

Playoffs

All draws times are listed in UTC+07:00.

"PP" - power play

Quarterfinals
February 28, 19:00

Semifinals
February 29, 10:00

Bronze-medal game
February 29, 15:00

Final
February 29, 15:00

Final standings

 - next year move to Division B
 - next year move to Division A

References

See also
2020 Russian Men's Curling Championship
2020 Russian Women's Curling Championship
2020 Russian Mixed Curling Championship
2020 Russian Junior Curling Championships
2020 Russian Wheelchair Curling Championship

Russian Mixed Doubles Curling Championship
Russian Mixed Doubles Curling Championship
Curling Mixed Doubles Championship
Russian Mixed Doubles Curling Championship
Russian Mixed Doubles Curling Championship
Sport in Krasnoyarsk